West Bromwich Central is a tram stop in the town centre of West Bromwich in the West Midlands, England. It was opened on 31 May 1999 and is situated on Midland Metro Line 1.

It occupies the site of the former West Bromwich railway station on the Great Western Railway line from Birmingham Snow Hill to Wolverhampton Low Level.

The town's main shopping centres are opposite the tram stop, along with the town's main bus station and Sandwell College's main campus.

In 2015/16 it was the most heavily used intermediate stop on Line 1.

Services
Mondays to Fridays, Midland Metro services in each direction between Birmingham and Wolverhampton run at six to eight-minute intervals during the day, and at fifteen-minute intervals during the evenings and on Sundays. They run at eight minute intervals on Saturdays.

References

 Article on this Metro stop from Rail Around Birmingham & the West Midlands

West Midlands Metro stops
Transport in Sandwell
West Bromwich
Railway stations in Great Britain opened in 1999